ANM Golam Mostafa, (1942 – 14 December 1971) was a martyred Bengali journalist.

Early life and career
Mostofa was born in 1942 in Pangagram in Nilphamari district. He graduated from Surendranath College in 1963. He completed his master's degree from University of Dhaka in 1965.

Mostafa, a sub-editor of Dainik Purbadesh, was an outspoken person known for his secular views.

Participation in Bengali movements
Mostafa suffer imprisonment for taking part anti-Ayub mass movement in 1969. According to Kamal Lohani, Mostofa started believing from late 1970 that the then East Pakistan would be independent and that Mostafa was the first to call East Pakistan, ‘Bangladesh.’

Death
Mostafa's son Anirban Mostafa was only nine months old when some armed Al-Badr men abducted his father from their Gopibagh house on December 11, 1971. Golam Mostafa never returned home, neither was his body ever found.

On 3 November 2013, Chowdhury Mueen-Uddin, a Muslim leader based in London, and Ashrafuz Zaman Khan, based in the US, were sentenced in absentia after the court found that they were involved in the abduction and murders of 18 people – six journalists including  Golam Mostafa, nine Dhaka University teachers and three physicians – in December 1971. Mueenuddin and Golam Mostafa were colleagues at the daily Purbadesh in 1971.

See also
 1971 Bangladesh atrocities

References

1942 births
1971 deaths
Bangladeshi murder victims
People murdered in Bangladesh
People killed in the Bangladesh Liberation War